Tang Jing (born 8 June 1995) is a Chinese judoka. She won one of the bronze medals in the women's 63 kg event at the 2018 Asian Games held in Jakarta, Indonesia.

In 2019, she won one of the bronze medals in the women's 63 kg event at the Asian-Pacific Judo Championships held in Fujairah, United Arab Emirates. A few months later, she competed in that event at the 2019 World Judo Championships held in Tokyo, Japan. In the women's 63 kg event at the 2019 Military World Games held in Wuhan, China, she won the gold medal.

In 2021, she won one of the bronze medals in her event at the Judo Grand Slam Antalya held in Antalya, Turkey.

References

External links
 

Living people
1995 births
Place of birth missing (living people)
Chinese female judoka
Judoka at the 2018 Asian Games
Asian Games bronze medalists for China
Asian Games medalists in judo
Medalists at the 2018 Asian Games
21st-century Chinese women